Zita Jungman, later Zita James (13 September 1903 – 18 February 2006), was one of the Bright Young Things.

Life
Jungman was born on 13 September 1903. Her father, Dutch-born artist Nico Wilhelm Jungmann, was a naturalized British subject who, in 1900, married her mother, Beatrice Mackay, from a devout Roman Catholic family in Birmingham. Her parents were divorced in 1918, after her father had been interned in Germany due to his British citizenship. He died in 1935. Her mother Beatrice then became the second wife of Richard Sidney Guinness (1873–1949), one of the banking Guinnesses, and a paternal uncle of Thomas Loel Guinness.

Jungman attended Miss Wolf's school in London and Miss Douglas's school at Queen's Gate School. At Queen's Gate she met Lady Eleanor Smith and Alannah Harper and together they became early members of what the British press would call the "Bright Young Things".

With her sister Teresa she tried to spend the night in Madam Tussaud's chamber of horrors. They removed the wax models of the "Princes in the Tower" to make themselves a bed and they were discovered by security staff during the night.

About Zita Jungman, and her sister Teresa, Cecil Beaton wrote: "The Jungman sisters are a pair of decadent 18th-century angels made of wax, exhibited at Madame Tussaud’s before the fire.... Zita has ... smooth polished complexion and shoulders, and unearthly hollow voice, but she has a serpent-like little nose and there is great architectural strength and firmness about her jaw and mouth. With her smooth fringes and rather flat head, like a silky coconut, like a medieval page, and with her swinging gait."

On 29 January 1929, she married Arthur James, the grandson of the Duke of Wellington. They divorced in 1932.

She appeared on television after her 100th birthday and she died in Ireland at the age of 102, survived by her sister.

References

1903 births
2006 deaths
20th-century English women
20th-century English people
British centenarians
English socialites
English people of Dutch descent
Women centenarians